Air Vice Marshal Ross Paterson,  is a Royal Air Force reservist who currently serves as Air Officer Scotland.

Career
After working in the Prime Minister's Strategy Unit, Paterson became Head of Strategy and Personnel Policy for the Royal Air Force (RAF) in May 2009, Chief Executive of the Service Personnel and Veterans Agency in October 2011, and Chief Executive of the Scottish Public Pensions Agency in May 2015.

Paterson is also an RAF reservist and he became Air Officer Scotland in January 2015.

References

Companions of the Order of the Bath
Living people
Officers of the Order of the British Empire
Year of birth missing (living people)